Ducker or Dücker is a surname. Notable people with the surname include:

Bruce Ducker (born 1938), American novelist, short story writer, and poet
Carl Gustaf Dücker (1663–1732), Swedish field marshal
Edward A. Ducker (1870–1946), Justice of the Supreme Court of Nevada 
Eugen Dücker (1841–1916), romanticist Baltic German painter
George Ducker (1871–1952), Canadian footballer 
Jack M. Ducker (fl. 1910–1930), painter of Scottish highland landscapes
John Ducker (1932–2005), Australian labor leader and politician
John Ducker (cricketer) (born 1934), Australian cricketer
John Francis Christopher Ducker, real name of John Leeson (born 1943), English actor
John L. Ducker (1922–2014), American politician and attorney
Sophie Charlotte Ducker (1909–2004), German-born Australian botanist
, a Swedish noble family

See also
Ducker & Son, British firm of shoemakers
Ducker Lake, in Nova Scotia, Canada